Bicerin is a traditional hot drink native to Turin, Italy, made of espresso, drinking chocolate, and milk served layered in a small glass.

Origin

This coffee beverage has existed since the 18th century and was praised by Alexandre Dumas in 1852. It is believed to be based on the 17th century drink bavarèisa ("Bavarian"): the key distinction is that in a bicerin the three components are carefully layered in the glass rather than being mixed together.

Caffè al Bicerin, which sits across from the Santuario della Consolata in Turin's piazza della Consolata,  has been serving the drink since the 18th century. Local lore suggests that Bicerin was invented at Caffė al Bicerin or at Caffė Fiorio around 1704.

Liqueur
The Vicenzi Family Distillery in Turin also produces a chocolate hazelnut liqueur under this name.

See also
 Espressino and marocchino, similar drinks
 List of chocolate beverages

References

Bicerin at prodottitipici.it

External links
 Bicerin in the New York Times
 Caffè al Bicerin

Culture in Turin
Chocolate drinks
Cuisine of Piedmont
Italian drinks
Coffee drinks
Hot drinks
Coffee in Italy